Magnus Johansen (1 December 1886 – 23 September 1970) was a Norwegian politician for the Labour Party.

He was born in Drammen.

He was elected to the Norwegian Parliament from Østfold in 1937, and was re-elected on one occasion. He had previously served in the position of deputy representative during the terms 1928–1930 and 1934–1936.

Arntzen was a member of the executive committee of Tune municipality council from 1913 to 1940 and of the municipality council from 1963 to 1967.

References

1886 births
1970 deaths
Labour Party (Norway) politicians
Members of the Storting
20th-century Norwegian politicians
Politicians from Drammen